William James Dally (born August 17, 1960) is an American computer scientist and educator. Since 2021, he has been a member of the President’s Council of Advisors on Science and Technology (PCAST).

Microelectronics 
He developed a number of techniques used in modern interconnection networks including routing-based deadlock avoidance, wormhole routing, link-level retry, virtual channels, global adaptive routing, and high-radix routers. He has developed efficient mechanisms for communication, synchronization, and naming in parallel computers including message-driven computing and fast capability-based addressing. He has developed a number of stream processors starting in 1995 including Imagine, for graphics, signal, and Image processing, and Merrimac, for scientific computing.

He has published over 200 papers as well as the textbooks "Digital Systems Engineering" with John Poulton, and "Principles and Practices of Interconnection Networks" with Brian Towles. He was inventor or co-inventor on over 70 granted patents.

An author quoted him saying: "Locality is efficiency, Efficiency is power, Power is performance, Performance is king".

Career

Bell Labs 

Dally received the B.S. degree in electrical engineering from Virginia Tech.
While working for  Bell Telephone Laboratories he contributed to the design of the Bellmac 32, an early 32-bit microprocessor, and earned an M.S. degree in electrical engineering from Stanford University in 1981.
He then went to the California Institute of Technology (Caltech), graduating with a Ph.D. degree in computer science in 1986. At Caltech he designed the MOSSIM simulation engine and an integrated circuit for routing. While at Caltech, he was part of the founding group of Stac Electronics in 1983.

MIT 
From 1986 to 1997 he taught at MIT where he and his group built the J–Machine and the M–Machine, parallel machines emphasizing low overhead synchronization and communication. During his MIT times he claims to have collaborated on developing design of Cray T3D and Cray T3E supercomputers.
He became the Willard R. and Inez Kerr Bell Professor in the Stanford University School of Engineering and chairman of the computer science department at Stanford.

Dally's corporate involvements include various collaborations at Cray Research since 1989.
He did Internet router work at Avici Systems starting in 1997, was chief technical officer at Velio Communications from 1999 until its 2003 acquisition by LSI Logic, founder and chairman of Stream Processors, Inc until it folded.

Nvidia and IEEE fellow 
Dally was elected a Fellow of the Association for Computing Machinery in 2002, and a Fellow of the IEEE, also in 2002. In 2003 he became a consultant for NVIDIA for the first time and helped to develop GeForce 8800 GPUs series. He received the ACM/SIGARCH Maurice Wilkes Award in 2000, the Seymour Cray Computer Science and Engineering Award in 2004, and the IEEE Computer Society Charles Babbage Award in 2006. In 2007 he was elected to the American Academy of Arts and Sciences. 

In January 2009 he was appointed chief scientist of Nvidia.
He worked full-time at Nvidia, while supervising about 12 of his graduate students at Stanford.

In 2009, he was elected to the National Academy of Engineering for contributions to the design of high-performance interconnect networks and parallel computer architectures.

He received the 2010 ACM/IEEE Eckert–Mauchly Award for "outstanding contributions to the architecture of interconnection networks and parallel computers."

Books
Dally and Poulton, Digital Systems Engineering, 1998, .
Dally and Towles, Principles and Practices of Interconnection Networks, 2004, .
Dally and Harting, Digital Design: A Systems Approach, 2012, .

References

External links
 Stanford Faculty Home Page

American computer scientists
American technology writers
Computer systems researchers
Fellows of the Association for Computing Machinery
Fellow Members of the IEEE
Stanford University School of Engineering faculty
Stanford University Department of Electrical Engineering faculty
Stanford University Department of Computer Science faculty
Massachusetts Institute of Technology faculty
California Institute of Technology alumni
Virginia Tech alumni
Stanford University School of Engineering alumni
Living people
Seymour Cray Computer Engineering Award recipients
Members of the United States National Academy of Engineering
American electrical engineers
Nvidia people
1960 births